Oxendine is a surname. Notable people with the surname include:

 John Oxendine (born 1962), American politician
 Ken Oxendine (born 1975), American football player